Staheli is a surname of Swiss-German origin which means "armorer." It is derived from Stahl. Notable people with the surname include:

Don H. Staheli (born 1949), American Mormon leader and author
Donald L. Staheli (1931–2010), American Mormon leader and business executive 
Konrad Stäheli (1866–1931), Swiss sports shooter
Lynn Staheli (born 1933), American pediatric orthopedist

References

Swiss-German surnames